The Cà Ty River is a river of Bình Thuận Province, Vietnam.

References

Rivers of Bình Thuận province
Rivers of Vietnam